Maale (also spelled Male) is an Omotic language spoken in the Omo Region of Ethiopia. The Maale people are maintaining their language vigorously, despite exposure to outside pressures and languages.

Notes

References 
 Van Aswegen, Jacobus. 2008. Language Maintenance and Shift in Ethiopia: The Case of Maale. MA thesis, University of South Africa.

External links 
 World Atlas of Language Structures information on Maale

Languages of Ethiopia
North Omotic languages